Ottoman studies is an interdisciplinary branch of the humanities that addresses the history, culture, costumes, religion, art, such as literature and music, science, economy, and politics of the Ottoman Empire. It is a sub-category of Oriental studies and Middle Eastern studies, and also Turkish studies.

According to Marc David Baer, Ottoman studies is an "ethically challenged field" because "Armenian genocide denial is widespread".

Institutions specializing in Ottoman studies
Turkish Studies Association
Skilliter Centre for Ottoman Studies
Centre for Ottoman Studies at SOAS, University of London
Ottoman and Turkish Studies, University of Chicago
Ottoman and Turkish Studies, Stanford University
Center for Ottoman Studies, Belgrade
Ottoman and Turkish Studies Association

Academic journals
Journal of the Ottoman and Turkish Studies Association

Notable people

Maurits van den Boogert (born 1972), Dutch historian
Suraiya Faroqhi (born 1941), German historian
Caroline Finkel, British historian
Thomas Day Goodrich (1927–2015), American historian
Halil İnalcık (1916–2016), Turkish historian
Kemal Karpat (1923–2019), Turkish historian
Hans-Lukas Kieser (born 1957), Swiss historian
Bernard Lewis (1916–2018), British-American historian
Heath W. Lowry (born 1942), American historian
Albert Howe Lybyer (1876–1949), American historian
Justin McCarthy (born 1945), American historian
Ali Kemal Meram (1914–2000), Turkish historian
Donald Quataert (1941–2011), American historian
Stanford J. Shaw (1930–2006), American historian
A. Holly Shissler, American historian
Elizabeth Zachariadou (1931–2018), Greek historian
Ara Sarafian (born 1961), British-Armenian historian

See also
Turkish studies
Turkology

References